Events from the year 1550 in India.

Events
 Afonso de Noronha becomes viceroy of India (until 1554)

Births
 Achyuta Pisharati, Sanskrit grammarian, astrologer, astronomer and mathematician (died 1621)
 Vijnanabhiksu, philosopher (died 1600)
 Chand Bibi, warrior and acting Regent of Bijapur (1580–90) and regent of Ahmednagar (1596–99) (died 1599)
 Rodolfo Acquaviva, Italian Jesuit missionary at the court of Akbar is born (dies 1583)
 Ralph Fitch, merchant, early European traveller to India and the court of Akbar and consultant to the East India Company is born (dies 1611)

Deaths
{death of nokialand}

See also

 Timeline of Indian history

References

See also
 Timeline of Indian history